The Crown is a historical drama web television series about the reign of Queen Elizabeth II, created and principally written by Peter Morgan, and produced by Left Bank Pictures and Sony Pictures Television for Netflix. It grew out of Morgan's film The Queen (2006) and his stage play The Audience (2013).

The following is a list of characters and respective cast members who appeared on the television series. The majority of the cast has changed every two seasons to better portray the characters as they age.

Characters and cast

Main

The following characters have been credited as main cast in the opening credits.

Featured

The following cast members have been credited in the opening titles of up to two episodes in a season.

Abdalla relied on a piece of audio of Dodi Fayed doing a call-in for the Larry King show to get a handle on Fayed's accent whilst speaking English, as Abdalla was unable to find an audio clip of Dodi Fayed online.

Recurring

The following characters have appeared in two or more episodes within a season.

Notable guests

The following cast members have appeared in a single episode within a season.

Notes

References

Crown
The Crown (TV series)